Sthenias varius is a species of beetle in the family Cerambycidae. It was described by Olivier in 1792, originally under the genus Lamia. It is known from Philippines.

References

varius
Beetles described in 1792